Ivan Lobay (born 21 May 1996) is a professional Ukrainian football defender who plays for Karpaty Lviv.

Career
Lobay is the product of the UFK Lviv School System. He made his debut for FC Karpaty playing full-time in a match against FC Hoverla Uzhhorod on 27 July 2014 in the Ukrainian Premier League.

He also played for the Ukrainian under-17 national football team and was called up for other age level representations.

References

External links
Statistics at UAF website (Ukr)

1996 births
Living people
People from Chervonohrad
Ukrainian footballers
Ukrainian expatriate footballers
FC Karpaty Lviv players
Association football defenders
Ukrainian Premier League players
Ukrainian First League players
Ukrainian Second League players
FC Rukh Lviv players
Nõmme Kalju FC players
Expatriate footballers in Estonia
Ukrainian expatriate sportspeople in Estonia
FC Lviv players
Ukraine youth international footballers
Ukraine under-21 international footballers
Meistriliiga players